Movetis was a pharmaceutical company headquartered in Belgium. It was founded in 2006 as a spin-off from parent company Johnson & Johnson. The company specialized in pharmaceuticals for treating  gastro-intestinal disorders.

The primary drug produced by Movetis was Prucalopride (known by the brand name "Resolor"), indicated for cases of chronic constipation.

History
Movetis was founded by Dirk Reyn, Staf Van Reet Jan schuurkes and Remi VandenBroek, and was backed by venture firms Sofinnova Partners, Sofinnova Ventures and Life Sciences Partners. In December 2009, it became a public company with an IPO on the New York Stock Exchange's Euronext. Shortly thereafter, it gained regulatory approval to distribute Resolor in 30 European countries.

In 2010, the company was acquired by British drugmaker Shire Plc for 428 million euros ($559 million).

References

Johnson & Johnson subsidiaries
Pharmaceutical companies of Belgium
Pharmaceutical companies established in 2006
2010 mergers and acquisitions